WLLY-FM (99.5 FM, "La Ley") is a commercial radio station licensed to Palm Beach Gardens, Florida and serving the Greater West Palm Beach area. The station's format is Regional Mexican.

History

WLLY-FM launched as WAFC-FM 106.3 in Clewiston, Florida, on July 2, 1979. It was owned by Tri-County Stereo and broadcast a modern country format.

WAFC-FM moved to 99.5 MHz and upgraded to a Class C3 station in 2001. It then moved to Palm Beach Gardens and downgraded back to Class A in 2009, allowing it to enter the West Palm Beach radio market.

HD Radio
On September 6, 2018, WLLY launched a classic hip hop format on its HD3 subchannel, branded as "Yo! 107.1" (simulcast on translator W296AW 107.1 FM Mangonia Park). That translator and the format are owned by Black Media Works, which used the translator to rebroadcast WJFP in Fort Pierce, Florida.

Translators

References

External links
WLLY-FM official website

LLY-FM